Hands Across the Rockies is a 1941 American Western film directed by Lambert Hillyer and starring Bill Elliott.

Plot
Wild Bill Hickok (Bill Elliott) and Cannonball (Dub Taylor) help two young people in love (Mary Daily and Stanley Brown) and bring the murderer (Kenneth MacDonald) of Cannonball's father to justice.

Cast          
 Bill Elliott as Wild Bill Hickok
 Mary Daily as Marsha Crawley
 Dub Taylor as Cannonball Taylor
 Kenneth MacDonald as Juneau Jessup
 Frank LaRue as Rufe Crawley
 Donald Curtis as Dade Crawley
 Tom Moray as Hi Crawley
 Stanley Brown as Johnny Peale
 Slim Whitaker as Marshal Bemis
 Harrison Greene as Abel Finney
 Art Mix as Red - Henchman 
 Eddy Waller as Judge Plunkett
 Hugh Prosser as Cash Jennings

References

External links
 

1941 films
American Western (genre) films
1941 Western (genre) films
Columbia Pictures films
Films directed by Lambert Hillyer
American black-and-white films
1940s English-language films
1940s American films